Aldermaston railway station serves the village of Aldermaston in Berkshire, England.

It was opened on 21 December 1847.

Description
Aldermaston station is between the A4 road and the settlement of Aldermaston Wharf. It has a flanking platform on each side of the double track line. Each platform has its own independent road access and car park, together with a small shelter. The two platforms are also linked by a footbridge. The Newbury-bound platform is flanked on its offside by a siding, formerly used as a headshunt for access to a nearby freight facility. Since the rebuilding of the A340 bridge over the railway line in 2012, the siding has been defunct.

History
The station was built by the Berks and Hants Railway, part of the Great Western Railway and stayed with that company after the Grouping of 1923. The line then became part of the Western Region of British Railways upon the subsequent nationalisation of the railways.

When Sectorisation was introduced, the station was served by Network SouthEast although trains of the Intercity Sector passed on the Reading to Taunton Line which uses the Berks and Hants to Westbury for some long-distance services. This continued until the Privatisation of British Railways.

The line was authorised by an Act of Parliament but never built. This is because the railway finances were loaned by the London and South Western Railway, who stipulated that the DN&SR must relinquish their sole rights to run Southampton-bound services on the line and to also abandon its plans for a link at Aldermaston with the Great Western Railway. The proposed route roughly followed the Enborne valley, passing south of Brimpton, before following the Gaily Brook and West Clere Scarp near Kingsclere on to Old Burghclere.

Services
Trains run hourly in both directions on Mondays to Saturdays, and on Sundays service is about every 2 hours. Typical journey times are about 15 minutes to Reading and 16 minutes to Newbury. Passengers for  must normally change trains at Reading, though there are a small number of weekday peak through trains and a regular service on Sundays.

References

External links

 Station on navigable O.S. map

Railway stations in Berkshire
DfT Category F1 stations
Former Great Western Railway stations
Railway stations in Great Britain opened in 1847
Railway stations served by Great Western Railway
Aldermaston
1847 establishments in England